Doona! is an upcoming South Korean streaming television series directed by Lee Jeong-hyo, and starring Bae Suzy, Yang Se-jong, and Lee Yu-bi. It is scheduled to release on Netflix in the fourth quarter of 2023.

Synopsis 
An ordinary college student, Won-jun, who meets Doo-na, who retired after leaving behind the glamorous K-pop idol days and become housemates.

Cast

Main 
 Bae Suzy as Lee Doo-na
 The main vocalist of a popular idol group and the center of popularity, but she announces her sudden retirement and stays in a share house in a college town.
 Yang Se-jong as Lee Won-jun
 An extremely ordinary college student who has nothing but a warm and pure heart that provides a place for Doo-na to rest.

Supporting 
 Lee Yu-bi
 Park Se-wan

Special appearances 
 Lee Jin-wook
 Go Ah-sung
 Lachicha

Production 
In July 2022, it was reported that the filming of the series began recently. On February 23, 2023, Bae Suzy posted a photo on SNS saying that the series had finished filming.

References

External links 
 
 
 

Korean-language Netflix original programming
Television shows based on South Korean webtoons
2023 web series debuts
South Korean web series
Upcoming Netflix original programming
2023 South Korean television series debuts
South Korean romance television series
Television series by Studio Dragon